The 1983 Dutch Grand Prix was a Formula One motor race held at Zandvoort on 28 August 1983. It was the twelfth race of the 1983 Formula One World Championship.

The 72-lap race was won by René Arnoux, driving a Ferrari, with team-mate Patrick Tambay second and John Watson third in a McLaren-Ford. Alain Prost and Nelson Piquet collided midway through the race while challenging for the lead, allowing Arnoux to move into second in the Drivers' Championship, eight points behind Prost. However, this would turn out to be Arnoux's last Formula One victory.

Derek Warwick finished fourth to score his and the Toleman team's first points. Mauro Baldi in the Alfa Romeo and Michele Alboreto in the Tyrrell completed the top six.

The race saw McLaren debut the new Porsche-built TAG turbo engine. Niki Lauda drove the TAG-powered MP4/1E car, while Watson continued with the Ford-powered McLaren. However, Lauda could only qualify 19th, four places behind Watson, and retired on lap 26 with a brake failure. Watson's third place was the last time a car with a naturally aspirated engine would legally finish on a Formula One podium until the 1988 Canadian Grand Prix.

Classification

Qualifying

Race

Championship standings after the race

Drivers' Championship standings

Constructors' Championship standings

References

Dutch Grand Prix
Grand Prix
Dutch Grand Prix
Dutch Grand Prix